Carl Cohen may refer to:

Carl Cohen (businessman) (1913–1986), American gambling executive and Las Vegas casino manager
Carl Cohen (professor) (born 1931), Professor of Philosophy at the University of Michigan, philosopher, and animal experimentation supporter